Ihor Ihorovych Kharatin (born 2 February 1995) is a Ukrainian professional footballer who plays as a defensive midfielder for Ekstraklasa club Legia Warsaw.

Career

Early career
Kharatin is product of the FC Dynamo Kyiv's Youth Sportive School. His first trainers were Oleksiy Drotsenko and Oleksandr Shpakov. He made his debut for Dynamo Kyiv in the Ukrainian Premier League played as a substituted player in the game against Zorya Luhansk on 18 May 2014.

In 2016, he played on loan for Metalist Kharkiv, then he transferred to Zorya Luhansk, where he played for two years.

Ferencváros
Kharatin joined Hungarian club Ferencváros in January 2019. On 20 October 2020, he scored his first UEFA Champions League goal for Ferencváros in a 5–1 defeat against Barcelona in the 2020–21 season.

On 16 June 2020, he became champion with Ferencváros by beating Budapest Honvéd at the Hidegkuti Nándor Stadion on the 30th match day of the 2019–20 Nemzeti Bajnokság I season.

On 29 September 2020, he was member of the Ferencváros team which qualified for the 2020–21 UEFA Champions League group stage after beating Molde FK on 3–3 aggregate (away goals) at the Groupama Aréna.

On 20 April 2021, he won the 2020–21 Nemzeti Bajnokság I season with Ferencváros by beating archrival Újpest FC 3–0 at the Groupama Arena.

Career statistics

Club

Honours
Ferencváros
Nemzeti Bajnokság I: 2018–19, 2019–20, 2020–21, 2021–22

References

External links
 
 

1995 births
Living people
People from Mukachevo
Ukrainian footballers
Association football midfielders
Ukraine international footballers
Ukraine youth international footballers
Ukraine under-21 international footballers
Ukrainian Premier League players
Nemzeti Bajnokság I players
Ekstraklasa players
FC Dynamo Kyiv players
FC Metalist Kharkiv players
FC Zorya Luhansk players
Ferencvárosi TC footballers
Legia Warsaw players
Ukrainian expatriate footballers
Ukrainian expatriate sportspeople in Hungary
Expatriate footballers in Hungary
Ukrainian expatriate sportspeople in Poland
Expatriate footballers in Poland
Sportspeople from Zakarpattia Oblast